Hook, Line and Sinker is a 1930 American pre-Code slapstick comedy directed by Edward F. Cline from a screenplay by Ralph Spence and Tim Whelan. It was the third starring vehicle for the comedy team of Wheeler & Woolsey (Bert Wheeler and Robert Woolsey), and also featured Dorothy Lee. It would be one of the largest financial successes for RKO Pictures in 1930.

Plot
Two fast-talking insurance salesmen — Wilbur Boswell and J. Addington Ganzy  — help penniless socialite Mary Marsh to turn a dilapidated hotel, which was willed to her, into a thriving success. They soon run into trouble, however, in the form of two sets of rival gangsters who want to break into the hotel safe; also, Mary's mother, Rebecca Marsh, wants her to marry wealthy lawyer John Blackwell, although Mary has fallen in love with Wilbur. And while she takes an instant dislike to Wilbur, Rebecca falls for Ganzy.  Adding to the complications is the fact that Blackwell is actually in league with the gangsters. The finale involves nighttime runarounds and a shoot-out in the hotel.  During the pitched battle between the rival gangs and the police, Boswell and Ganzy save the jewels, after which Ganzy marries Rebecca, and then gives away Mary at her marriage to Wilbur.

Cast
Bert Wheeler as Wilbur Boswell
Robert Woolsey as Addington Ganzy
Dorothy Lee as Mary Marsh
Jobyna Howland as Rebecca Marsh
Ralf Harolde as John Blackwell (Buffalo Blackie)
William B. Davidson as Frank Dukette (Duke of Winchester)
Natalie Moorhead as Duchess Bessie Von Essie
George F. Marion as Ritz De La Rivera Bellboy
Hugh Herbert as  Hotel House Detective
Stanley Fields as McKay

(Cast list as per AFI database)

Reception
The film made a profit of $225,000, and would be one of the top two money earners for RKO Radio Pictures in 1930.

Notes
In 1958, the film entered the public domain in the United States because the claimants did not renew its copyright registration in the 28th year after publication.

References

External links
 
 
 

1930 films
1930 romantic comedy films
American romantic comedy films
American black-and-white films
1930s English-language films
Films set in hotels
Films directed by Edward F. Cline
RKO Pictures films
1930s American films